Fridericia is a genus of plants in the family Bignoniaceae.

Species 
 Fridericia artherion
 Fridericia bahiensis
 Fridericia bracteolata
 Fridericia candicans
 Fridericia carichanensis
 Fridericia caudigera
 Fridericia celastroides
 Fridericia chica
 Fridericia cinerea
 Fridericia cinnamomea
 Fridericia claussenii
 Fridericia conjugata
 Fridericia corchoroides
 Fridericia costaricensis
 Fridericia crassa
 Fridericia craterophora
 Fridericia cuneifolia
 Fridericia dichotoma
 Fridericia dispar
 Fridericia egensis
 Fridericia elegans
 Fridericia erubescens
 Fridericia fagoides
 Fridericia fanshawei
 Fridericia floribunda
 Fridericia florida
 Fridericia formosa
 Fridericia grosourdyana
 Fridericia guilielma
 Fridericia japurensis
 Fridericia lasiantha
 Fridericia lauta
 Fridericia leucopogon
 Fridericia limae
 Fridericia mollis
 Fridericia mollissima
 Fridericia monophylla
 Fridericia mutabilis
 Fridericia nicotianiflora
 Fridericia nigrescens
 Fridericia oligantha
 Fridericia ornithophila
 Fridericia oxycarpa
 Fridericia paradoxa
 Fridericia parviflora
 Fridericia patellifera
 Fridericia pearcei
 Fridericia pilulifera
 Fridericia platyphylla
 Fridericia pliciflora
 Fridericia podopogon
 Fridericia poeppigii
 Fridericia prancei
 Fridericia pubescens
 Fridericia pulchella
 Fridericia rego
 Fridericia samydoides
 Fridericia schumanniana
 Fridericia simplex
 Fridericia speciosa
 Fridericia spicata
 Fridericia subincana
 Fridericia subverticillata
 Fridericia trachyphylla
 Fridericia trailii
 Fridericia triplinervia
 Fridericia truncata
 Fridericia tynanthoides
 Fridericia whitei
 Fridericia viscida

References

External links
 
 
 Arrabidaea at The Plant List
 Arrabidaea at Tropicos

Bignoniaceae
Bignoniaceae genera